The Thai highway network follows the left-hand traffic rule of the road. The network is the twin responsibility of the Department of Highways (DOH, Krom Thang Luang), and the Department of Rural Roads (DORR, Krom Thang Luang Chonnabot), under the oversight of the Transportation ministry of Thailand. Public highways (thang luang) are also called public roads (thanon luang), especially when part of urban streets. The network spans over 70,000 kilometers across all regions of Thailand.
Most are single carriageways. Dual carriageways have frequent u-turn lanes and intersections slowing down traffic. Coupled with the increase in the number of vehicles and the demand for a limited-access motorway, the Thai Government issued a Cabinet resolution in 1997 detailing the motorway construction master plan.  Some upgraded sections of highway are being turned into a "motorway", while other motorways are not being built from highway sections.

Types of highways 
The 1992 Highway Act, revised as the 2006 Highway Act, defines the following five highway types:

A special highway or motorway is a high capacity highway designed for high speed traffic, for which the Department of Highways carries out construction, expansion, upkeep and repairs, and is registered as such. Motorway entrances and exits have controlled access, and controlled by the DOH. Registration of motorways is overseen by the Director General of the DOH.

A national highway is a primary highway, part of the network connecting regions, provinces, districts, and other important destinations, for which the DOH carries out construction, expansion, upkeep and repairs. Registration of national highways is overseen by the Director General of the DOH.

A rural highway or rural road is a highway for which the Department of Rural Roads carries out construction, expansion, upkeep and repairs. Registration of rural highways is overseen by the Director General of the DORR.

A local highway or local route is a highway for which the local administrative organization carries out construction, expansion, upkeep and repairs. Registration of rural highways is overseen by the provincial governor.

A concession highway is a highway for which a legal government concession has been granted. Registration of concession highways is overseen by the Director General of the DOH.

Highway numbering
The first digit of a highway number indicates the region of Thailand it serves, with the number of digits indicating the highway classification. These regions are:
 Northern Thailand.
 Northeastern Thailand.
 Central and eastern, including the upper south.
 Southern Thailand, except the upper south.

A single digit indicates one of four highways connecting Bangkok to outlying regions:
 Route 1 (Phahonyothin Road) to northern Thailand
 Route 2 (Mittraphap Road) to northeastern Thailand
 Route 3 (Sukhumvit Road) to eastern Thailand
 Route 4 (Phet Kasem Road) to southern Thailand

Two digits indicate a principal highway within a region, such as Route 22 in the northeast between Udon Thani and Nakhon Phanom.

Three digits indicate a regional secondary highway, such as northeastern Route 202 between Chaiyaphum and Khemarat, and central Route 314 between Bang Pakong and Cha Choeng Sao.

Four digits indicate an intra-province highway connecting a provincial capital to its districts, or between important sites, such as northern Route 1001 between the Route 11 intersection and Amphoe Phrao, and southern Route 4006 between the Route 4 intersection (Ratchakrut) and Lang Suan.

Highways by region

Northern Thailand 

  Highway 1 (Phahonyothin Road): Bangkok – Chiang Rai and continuing to Tachilek, Burma as  
  Highway 11: In Buri, Sing Buri – Chiang Mai
  Highway 101: Kamphaeng Phet – Nan as 
  Highway 102: Si Satchanalai, Sukhothai – Uttaradit
  Highway 103: Rong Kwang, Phrae – Ngao, Lampang
  Highway 104: Kosamphi Nakhon, Kamphaeng Phet – Tak
  Highway 105: Tak – Mae Sariang, Mae Hong Son
  Highway 106: Thoen, Lampang – Chiang Mai
  Highway 107: Chiang Mai – Mae Chan
  Highway 108: Chiang Mai – Mae Hong Son
  Highway 109: Fang – Mae Suai
  Highway 110: Chiang Rai – Mae Sai, Chiang Rai (now superseded by Route 1)
  Highway 111: Phichit Bypass Road
  Highway 112: Kamphaeng Phet Bypass Road
  Highway 112: Wang Thong – Khao Sai (now superseded by Route 11)
  Highway 113: Phichit – Phetchabun
  Highway 114: Lamphun town route
  Highway 115: Kamphaeng Phet - Phichit
  Highway 116: Lamphun - San Pa Tong, Chiang Mai
  Highway 117: Nakhon Sawan – Phitsanulok
  Highway 118: Chiang Mai – Chiang Rai
  Highway 119: Uttaradit town route (now superseded by Route 102)
  Highway 120: Mueang Phayao - Wiang Pa Pao
  Highway 121: Chiang Mai Outer Ring Road
  Highway 122: Nakhon Sawan Bypass Road as  
  Highway 123: Mae Sai Bypass Road as  
  Highway 125: Sukhothai Bypass Road as 
  Highway 126: Phitsanulok Bypass Road
  Highway 127: Lampang Bypass Road
  Highway 128: Mae Hong Son Bypass Road
  Highway 129: Phrae Bypass Road as 
  Highway 130: Entrance to Thai-Myanmar Friendship Bridge over Moei River (Tak Province)
  Highway 131: Chiang Rai Bypass Road
  Route 1001: Chiang Mai - Phrao
  Route 1004: Chiang Mai - Doi Suthep-Pui National Park
  Route 1006: Chiang Mai – Mae On
  Route 1007: Entrance to Doi Saket
  Route 1009: Chom Thong - Doi Inthanon summit
  Route 1010: Hwy 108 (Ban Nong Hai) - Hwy 106 (Ban Pak Thang) 
  Route 1012: Hot - Wang Luang
  Route 1013: San Pa Tong - Ban Kat
  Route 1014: Doi Saket - Pa Bong - San Pa Kha
  Route 1015: Lamphun - San Pa Tong
  Route 1016: Mae Chan - Chiang Saen
  Route 1019: Route 11 (Chiang Mai) - Mae Sai (now superseded by Route 118)
  Route 1020: Chiang Rai - Chiang Khong
  Route 1021: Mae Tam - Thoeng
  Route 1022: Phrae - Nam Khai
  Route 1023: Phrae - Wang Chin
  Route 1024: 
  Route 1026: Wiang Sa - Pak Nai
  Route 1030: 
  Route 1033:
  Route 1034:
  Route 1035:
  Route 1036:
  Route 1037:
  Route 1039:
  Route 1040: Tha Thong - Hat Kruat
  Route 1041:
  Route 1045:
  Route 1046:
 Route 1047: Route 11 (Pa Khun) - Muang Chet Ton (now superseded by Route 117)
  Route 1048:
  Route 1053:
  Route 1054:
  Route 1055:
  Route 1056:
  Route 1058:
  Route 1061:
  Route 1063:
  Route 1064:
  Route 1065:
  Route 1067:
  Route 1068:
  Route 1069:
  Route 1070:
  Route 1072:
  Route 1073:
  Route 1074:
 Route 1080: Nan - Lao border at Huai Kon (now superseded by Route 101)
  Route 1081:
  Route 1083:
  Route 1084:
 Route 1085: Mae Sot - Mae Sariang (now superseded by Route 105)
  Route 1086:
  Route 1087:
  Route 1088:
  Route 1089:
  Route 1090:
 Route 1091:
  Route 1092:
  Route 1093:
 Route 1094:
  Highway 1095: Mae Taeng - Mueang Mae Hong Son
  Route 1096:
  Route 1097:
  Route 1098:
  Route 1099: Highway 108 (Ban Kio Lom) - Omkoi - Mae Tuen
  Route 1100: Entrance to Doi Kew Ruesi
  Route 1101: Thung Hong - Pa Daeng
 Route 1102: Phra Bat - Ban Lao
 Route 1103: Li - Hot
 Route 1104: Entrance to Wang Kaphi
 Route 1104: Wang Kaphi - Phrom Phiram; now part of Highway 117
  Route 1105: 
  Route 1106: 
  Route 1107: 
  Route 1108: 
  Route 1109: 
  Route 1110: 
  Route 1111: 
  Route 1112: 
  Route 1113: Mueang Kai - Chaliang; now part of Highway 102
  Route 1114: 
  Route 1115: 
  Route 1116: 
  Route 1117: 
  Route 1118: 
  Route 1119: 
  Route 1120: 
  Route 1121: 
  Route 1123: 
  Route 1124: 
  Route 1125: 
  Route 1126: 
 Route 1127: Highway 1 - Ban Tam; designation decommissioned
  Route 1128: 
  Route 1129: 
  Route 1130: 
Route 1131: 
  Route 1132: 
 Route 1133:
  Route 1134:
 Route 1135:
  Route 1136:
 Route 1137:
 Route 1138: 
 Route 1139:
 Route 1140:
  Route 1141:
 Route 1142: Nakhon Sawan  - Highway 115; now part of Highway 117
  Route 1143: 
 Route 1144: 
  Route 1145:
 Route 1146: Highway 1047 - Electricity Generating Authority of Thailand (Pak Pat); now part of Highway 1045
  Highway 1147:
  Route 1148:
  Route 1149: 
  Route 1150: 
 Route 1151: Highway 110 - Pong Phra Bat Falls
  Route 1152: 
 Route 1153: Highway 1080 (Pon) - Highway 1080 (Ban Sop Puen)
  Route 1154:
  Route 1155:
  Route 1156:
  Route 1157: 
 Route 1158:
 Route 1159: 
 Route 1160: 
 Route 1161: connection to Phitsanulok NACC radio station; downgraded to local road
  Route 1162: 
  Route 1163:
  Route 1166: 
  Route 1167:
  Route 1168:
  Route 1169:
  Route 1170:
 Route 1172:
  Route 1173:
  Route 1174:
  Route 1175:
  Route 1176:
  Route 1177:
  Route 1178:
  Route 1179:
 Highway 1180
  Route 1181:
  Route 1182:
  Route 1184:
 Highway 1185: 
  Route 1186:
  Route 1187: Si Satchanalai - crossing over the Yom River; now part of Highway 102
  Route 1188:
  Route 1189:
  Route 1190:
 Route 1191:
  Route 1192:
  Route 1193:
 Route 1194:
  Route 1195:
  Route 1196:
 Route 1198:
  Highway 1201:
  Highway 1202:
 Highway 1203: Entrance to Pa Sao; now local road 60-001
  Highway 1204:
  Highway 1205:
  Highway 1206:
 Highway 1207:
  Highway 1208:
  Highway 1209:
  Highway 1210:
  Highway 1211:
 Highway 1212:
 Highway 1213:
  Highway 1214:
  Highway 1215:
  Highway 1216:
  Highway 1217:
 Highway 1218: Highway 1134 (Ban Wiang) - Phra That Pu Jae; designation decommissioned
  Highway 1219:
 Highway 1220: Highway 11 (Wat Bot) - Na Kham; downgraded to local road
  Highway 1221:
  Highway 1222:
  Highway 1225:
  Highway 1226:
 Highway 1227:
 Highway 1228:
  Highway 1229:
  Highway 1230:
  Highway 1232:
  Highway 1233:
  Highway 1234: Entrance to Phra Borommathat Chedi Srinakarin
 Highway 1235: Highway 1184 (Ban Puang) - Mae Bon; now part of Highway 1274
  Highway 1237:
 Highway 1239: Nam Pat - Huai Min; now Highway 1339
 Highway 1241:
  Highway 1242:
  Highway 1243:
  Highway 1244:
 Highway 1245:
  Highway 1246:
 Highway 1247:
 Highway 1248:
  Highway 1249:
  Highway 1250:
  Highway 1251:
  Highway 1252:
 Highway 1253:
 Highway 1254: Entrance to Thang Khea
  Highway 1255:
  Highway 1256:
  Highway 1257:
 Highway 1258: Highway 1168 (Ban Mai) - Nam Pu; designation decommissioned
 Highway 1259: Highway 1258 (Nam Pang) - Nam Phang Noi; downgraded to local road
  Highway 1260: Mae Rim Bypass Road
 Highway 1261:
 Highway 1262:
  Highway 1263:
  Highway 1264:
  Highway 1265:
  Highway 1266:
  Highway 1267:
  Highway 1268:
  Highway 1269:
  Highway 1270:
  Highway 1271:
  Highway 1272:
 Highway 1273: Highway 11 (Don Fai) - Highway 1100 (Naphan); downgraded to local road
  Highway 1274:
  Highway 1275:
  Highway 1276:
  Highway 1278:
 Highway 1279: Highway 1148 (Song Khwae) - Bannasophit; downgraded to local road
  Highway 1280:
  Highway 1281:
 Highway 1282: Phayao - Wang Nuea; now part of Highway 120
 Highway 1283: Connection to Sai Ngam; downgraded to local road
  Highway 1285:
 Highway 1286:
 Highway 1287:
 Highway 1288:
 Highway 1289:
 Highway 1290:
 Highway 1291: Highway 1080 (Na Noon) - Ban Kok; downgraded to rural road
  Highway 1292:
  Highway 1293:
 Highway 1294:
  Highway 1295:
  Highway 1296:
 Highway 1297:
 Highway 1298:
  Highway 1299:
 Highway 1300:
 Highway 1301:
 Highway 1303:
 Highway 1304:
 Highway 1305: Nong O - Sarachit; now part of Highway 102
 Highway 1306:
 Highway 1307:
 Highway 1308:
 Highway 1309:
 Highway 1310:
 Highway 1311:
 Highway 1312:
 Highway 1313:
 Highway 1314:
 Highway 1316: Highway 1193 - Analyo Temple Training Center; now rural road 4021
 Highway 1317:
 Highway 1318:
 Highway 1319:
 Highway 1320: End of Highway 113 - Highway 115; downgraded to local road
 Highway 1321:
 Highway 1322:
 Highway 1323:
 Highway 1324:
 Highway 1325: Route 12 (Phitsanulok) - Naresuan Dam; now part of Highway 117
 Highway 1326:
 Highway 1327:
 Highway 1328:
 Highway 1329:
 Highway 1330:
 Highway 1331:
 Highway 1332:
 Highway 1333:
 Highway 1334:
 Highway 1335:
 Highway 1336:
 Highway 1337:
 Highway 1338:
 Highway 1339:
 Highway 1340: Entrance to Mae Lana
 Highway 1340: Nong Uk - Baan Luang; designation decommissioned
 Highway 1341:
 Highway 1342:
 Highway 1343:
 Highway 1344:
 Highway 1345:
 Highway 1346:
 Highway 1347:
 Highway 1348: Entrance to Mae Moh Power Plant
 Highway 1349:
 Highway 1350:
 Highway 1351:
 Highway 1352:
 Highway 1353:
 Highway 1354:
 Highway 1355:
 Highway 1356: Entrance to 4th Bridge over the Mekong River
 Highway 1357:
 Highway 1358:
 Highway 1359:
 Highway 1360:
 Highway 1361:
 Highway 1362:
 Highway 1363:
 Highway 1364:
 Highway 1365:
 Highway 1366:
 Highway 1367:
 Highway 1368:
 Highway 1369:
 Highway 1370:
 Highway 1371:
 Highway 1372:
 Highway 1373:
 Highway 1374:
 Highway 1375:
 Highway 1376:
 Highway 1377:
 Highway 1378:
 Highway 1379:
 Highway 1380:
 Highway 1381:
 Highway 1382:
 Highway 1383:
 Highway 1384:
 Highway 1385:
 Highway 1386:
 Highway 1387:
 Highway 1388:
 Highway 1389:
 Highway 1390:
 Highway 1391:
 Highway 1393:
 Highway 1394:
 Highway 1395:
 Highway 1396:
 Highway 1397:
 Highway 1398:
 Highway 1399:
  Highway 1400:
  Highway 1401:
  Highway 1402:
  Highway 1403:
  Highway 1404: Nong Chang - Si Satchanalai
  Highway 1405: Phrae Airport Bypass Road
  Highway 1407: Entrance to Mae Khaem Falls
  Highway 1408: Entrance to Sawankhalok Cooperative Estate
  Highway 1409: Entrance to 2nd Mae Sai Friendship Bridge
  Highway 1410:
  Highway 1411: Nong Khok - Than Thahan
  Highway 1412:
  Highway 1413: Entrance to Sukhothai
  Highway 1414: Dong Pa Lan - Nong Ma Chap
  Highway 1415: Entrance to Thung Saliam
  Highway 1416: Entrance to the Pangda Royal Agricultural Station
  Highway 1417: 
  Highway 1418: Entrance to Chiang Mai International Airport
  Highway 1419: Entrance to Den Chai
  Highway 1420: Entrance to Phrae
  Highway 1421: Chiang Rai - Highway 1020 (Ban Huai Sak)
  Highway 1422: Entrance to Mae Lai
 Highway 1424: Entrance to Phrae Airport
 Highway 1425: Road around Friendship Bridge 4 (Chiang Khong)
 Highway 1427: Entrance to section 2 of Nakhon Sawan Highway
 Highway 1428: Mae Ma - Wiang Kaew
 Highway 1429: Wiang Kaew - Wang Lao
 Highway 1430: Sop Bok - Koh Pha Kham

Northeastern Thailand 
  Highway 21 (Khotchaseni Road): Saraburi–Loei.
  Highway 23 (Chaeng Sanit Road, ถนนแจ้งสนิท): Ban Phai, Khon Kaen–Ubon Ratchathani.
  Highway 24 (Sathonlamak Road): Nakhon Ratchasima–Ubon Ratchathani.
  Highway 201: Sikhio, Nakhon Ratchasima–Chiang Khan, Loei
  Highway 202 (Arunprasert Road): Chaiyaphum–Khemarat, Ubon Ratchathani
  Highway 203: Lom Sak - Loei (now superseded by Route 21)
  Highway 204: Ratchasima Bypass Road
  Highway 205 (Suranarai Road): Lopburi–Nakhon Ratchasima 
  Route 206 (Phimai Road): Khae Market - Hin Dat
  Route 207: Phon, Khon Kaen-Non Daeng, Nakhon Ratchasima via Ban Mai Chaiyaphot, Buriram
  Route 208: Maha Sarakham-Khon Kaen (Tambon Tha Phra)
  Route 209: Entrance to Khon Kaen
  Route 209: Khon Kaen-Yang Talat, Kalasin (now superseded by Route 12)
  Route 210: Wang Saphung, Loei–Udon Thani
  Route 211: Chiang Khan, Loei–Nong Khai
  Route 212 (Chayanggoon): Nong Khai–Ubon Ratchathani
  Route 213 (Thinanon Road): Maha Sarakham–Sakon Nakhon (now superseded by Highway 12 only Yang Talat-Somdet; section in Kalasin now superseded by Highway 299)
  Route 214: Kalasin–Chong Chom, Kap Choeng, Surin
  Route 215: Roi Et–Tha Tum, Surin
  Route 216: Udon Thani Ring Road
  Route 217: Warin Chamrap-Sirindhorn (Ubon Ratchatani)
  Route 218: Mueang Buriram-Nang Rong (Buriram)
  Route 219: Borabue, Maha Sarakham-Ban Kruat, Buriram
  Route 220 Sisaket - Khukhan
  Route 221: Sisaket - Khao Phra Wihan National Park
  Highway 222: Phang Khon, Sakon Nakhon-Bueng Kan
  Route 223: Sakon Nakhon-That Phanom, Nakhon Phanom
  Route 224: Nakhon Ratchasima–Kap Choeng, Surin
  Route 225: Chaiyaphum-Phetchabun-Nakhon Sawan
  Route 226: Nakhon Ratchasima–Ubon Ratchathani
  Route 227: Kalasin-Phang Khon, Sakon Nakhon
  Route 228: Chum Phae, Khon Kaen–Mueang Nong Bua Lamphu
  Route 229: Kaeng Khro, Chaiyaphum–Mancha Khiri, Khon Kaen
  Route 230 Mueang Khon Kaen Ring Road
  Route 231 Mueang Ubon Ratchathani Ring Road
  Route 232 Mueang Roi Et Ring Road
  Route 233: Entrance to Nong Khai (Route 2 - Route 212) 
  Route 234: Phetchabun Bypass Road
  Route 235: Kae Bypass Road (now superseded by Route 223)
  Route 238: Mukdahan Bypass Road
  Route 239: Entrance to bridge over the Mekong River (Mukdahan)
  Route 240: Phanom Bypass Road
  Route 241: Sakon Bypass Road
  Route 242: Nong Khai - Tha Bo
  Route 243: Entrance to checkpoint at Nong Khai
  Route 244: Entrance to bridge over the Mekong River (Amphoe Mueang Bueng Kan)
  Route 288 (Mueang Buriram Ring Road)
  Route 290 (Mueang Nakhon Ratchasima Ring Road)
  Route 291: Mahasarakham Bypass Road
  Route 292: Yasothon Bypass Road
  Route 293: Surin Bypass Road
  Route 294: Sisaket Bypass Road
  Route 295: Entrance to bridge over the Mekong River (Nakhom Phanom)
 Highway 299: Lam Nam Phan - Nong Bong; former portion of Highway 12 (was portions of Highway 213 and Highway 2042 before that)
  Route 2027: Route 22 (Phang Khom) - Waritchaphum (now superseded by Route 227)
 Route 2042: Somdet, Kalasin-Mukdahan (now superseded by Route 12)
 Route 2057: Ben Phai - Mancha Khiri (now superseded by Route 229)
 Route 2169: Yasothon Route 23-Bypass north to Amphoe Sai Mun–Kut Chum–Thai Charoen–Loeng Nok Tha–Route 2047, thence east 5 km to NS Route 212
  Route 2256: Chai Badan - Dan Khun Thot
 Highway 2425: Khok Sri Tong - Tonnae; former routing of Highway 223

Central, western and eastern Thailand 

  Highway 3 (Sukhumvit Road) : Bangkok–Trat as 
  Highway 31 (Vibhavadi Rangsit Road): Bangkok–Pathum Thani.
  Highway 32 Ayutthaya–Nakhon Sawan as  
  Highway 33 (Suwannasorn Road) : Saraburi–Sa Kaeo as 
  Highway 34 (Debaratna Road): Bangkok–Chachoengsao as 
  Highway 35 (Rama II Road): Bangkok–Pak Tho
  Highway 37: (Cha'am-Pranburi Bypass Road): Cha Am - Pranburi
  Highway 37: Bangkok Outer Ring Road; now Motorway 9
  Highway 38 (Don Mueang/Uttaraphimuk tollway)
  Highway 301: Bang Sue (Bangkok) - Nonthaburi
  Highway 302 (Rattanathibet Road): Chatuchak (Bangkok) - Bang Yai (Nonthaburi)
  Route 303  (Suksawat Road): Chom Thong-Phra Samut Chedi
  Route 304: Pak Kret, Nonthaburi–Nakhon Ratchasima as 
  Route 305: Rangsit–Nakhon Nayok
  Route 306 (Rama VII Bridge–Bang Phun)
  Route 307: Pak Kret–Pathum Thani
  Route 308: Entrance to Bang Pa-in
  Route 309 (Rojana Road): Sing Buri – Ang Thong, Ayutthaya, following the Chao Phraya river
  Route 310: Entrance to Saraburi
  Route 311 (Narai Maharaj Road): Route 1, Mueang Lop Buri District – Route 1, Mueang Chai Nat District
  Route 312: Route 1 to Chai Nat; now part of Route 3521
  Route 313: Uthai Thani - Manorom  - Route 1; now part of Route 3265
  Route 314 (Siri Sothon Road): Bang Pakong - Chachoengsao (Chachoengsao Province)
  Route 315: Chachoengsao - Chonburi
  Route 316: Route 3 – Route 3150 (Chantaburi)
  Route 317: Chantaburi – Sa Kaeo
  Route 318: Trat – Hat Lek; now part of Route 3
  Route 319 (Suwinthawong Road): Nong Cha Om - Phanom Sarakham
  Route 320 (Prachin Thani Road)
  Route 321 (Malaiman Road): Nakhon Pathom - Mueang Suphan
  Route 322 Mueang Suphan - Don Chedi (Suphanburi)
  Route 323: (Sangchuto Road): Ban Pong District (Ratchaburi Province) - Three Pagodas Pass, Sangkhla Buri District (Kanchanaburi Province) as 
  Route 324: Kanchanaburi Province – Suphan Buri Province
  Route 325: Bang Phae, Ratchaburi – Mueang Samut Songkhram
  Route 326: (Prachuap Khiri Khan Road): Entrance to Prachuap Khiri Khan
  Route 327 (Chumphon-Ranong Road, Mueang Chumphon Road): Pathomphon Intersection – Doc Lek Intersection
  Route 329: Nong Khae - Suphan Buri, now part of Route 33
  Route 330: Entrance to Ratchaburi
  Route 331: Sattahip (Chonburi Province) – Phanom Sarakham (Chachoengsao Province)
  Route 332 (Sattahip Bypass Road): Sattahip (Chonburi Province) – Ban Chang (Rayong Province)
  Route 333: U Thong (Suphan Buri Province) – Phayuha Khiri (Nakhon Sawan Province)
  Route 334: Mueang Ang Thong – Route 309 (Ang Thong Province)
  Route 335: Route 32 – Route 311 (Mueang Sing Buri District)
  Highway 336 (Lat Phrao Road): Chatuchak District - Huai Khwang - Wang Thonglang – Bang Kapi (Bangkok)
  Highway 338 (Borommaratchachonnani Road): Bangkok Noi – Route 4 (Nakhon Chai Si) as 
  Route 339: Route 306 (Bang Sue) - Nonthaburi - Pathum Thani; now part of Route 307
  Route 340: Motorway 9/Route 345, Bang Bua Thong (Nonthaburi Province) – Route 1, Mueang Chai Nat (Chai Nat Province); became a portion of Route 37, now a portion of Motorway 9
  Route 341 (Sirindhorn Road): Bang Phlat – Bang Kruai (Nonthaburi Province)
  Route 342 (Pradit Manutham Road): Khet Bang Khen, Bangkok - Khet Watthana, Bangkok; downgraded to local road
  Highway 343 (Rama IX Road): Din Daeng - Suan Luang (Bangkok); downgraded to local road
  Route 344: Route 3, Mueang Chonburi (Chonburi Province) – Route 3, Klaeng (Rayong Province)
  Route 345: Motorway 9/Route 340, Bang Bua Thong (Nonthaburi Province) – Route 346, Mueang Pathum Thani (Pathum Thani District)
  Route 346: Route 1/Route 305, Thanyaburi (Pathum Thani Province)– Route 324, Phanom Thuan (Kanchanaburi Province)
  Route 347: Mueang Pathum Thani (Pathum Thani Province) – Maha Rat District (Ayutthaya Province) as 
  Route 348: Aranyaprathet – Nang Rong as 
  Route 349: Route 315, Phanat Nikhom – Route 344, Nong Chak
  Route 350: Route 351, Nawamin – Route 304, Saeng Arun (Bangkok)
  Route 351 (Prasoet Manukit Road): Chatuchak District - Bueng Kum (Bangkok)
  Route 352: Route 3004, Thanyaburi (Pathum Thani Province) – Route 309, Wang Noi (Ayutthaya Province)
  Route 354: Entrance to Suvarnabhumi Airport
  Route 356 (Ayutthaya Bypass Road): Route 32 – Route 347 (Ayutthaya)
  Route 357: Suphanburi Ring Road
  Route 359: Route 33, Mueang Sa Kaeo (Sa Kaeo Province) – Route 304, Phanom Sarakham (Chachoengsao Province)
  Route 360: Entrance to Chumphon
  Route 361: Chonburi Bypass Road
  Route 362: Saraburi Ring Road
  Route 363: Rayong Government Center - Map Ta Phut Industrial Estate; former Route 3514
  Route 364: Rayong Bypass Road
  Route 365: Chachoengsao Bypass Road
  Route 366: Lopburi Bypass Road
  Route 367: Kanchanaburi Bypass Road
  Route 368: Ang Thong Bypass Road
  Route 369: Singburi Bypass Road
  Route 370 (Suvarnabhumi Road 3): Entrance to Suvarnabhumi Airport
  Route 372: Aranyaprathet Bypass Road
  Route 375: Ban Bo - Don Tum
 Route 376: Ratchaburi Bypass Road; former rural road 1010
 Route 3001: Entrance to barracks at Chiraprawat
 Route 3002: Pak Nam Pho – Tha Ta Kui, designation decommissioned
 Route 3003: Route 1 – Chao Phraya River (Krok Phra), now rural road 1111
  Route 3004: Chiraprawat – Sap Samo Thot
 Route 3005: Nakhon Sawan - Krok Phra
  Route 3006: Entrance to Takhli Market
 Route 3007: Route 3265 – Thanam (Uthai Thani Province), designation decommissioned
  Route 3008: Phayuha Khiri - Noen Makok
 Route 3009: Hankha original route, now part of Route 3211
  Route 3010: Sapphaya - Route 340, Sankhaburi
  Route 3012: Entrance to Nong Chang Market
  Route 3013: Nong Chang – Route 1072, Lat Yao
 Route 3014:
  Route 3015
  Route 3016: Lopburi – Erawan Camp (Lopburi Province)
  Route 3017: Nikhom – Wang Muang intersection
 Route 3018:
  Route 3019:	Khok Krathiam intersection (Route 1) – Khok Krathiam Railway Station (Lopburi Province)
  Route 3020: Phra Phutthabat - Nong Don (Saraburi Province)
 Route 3021: Entrance to Ban Mo, designation decommissioned
  Route 3022: Route 3020, Phra Phutthabat – Tha Ruea (Saraburi Province)
 Route 3023 (Tha Ruea–Tha Lan Road): Tha Lan – Tha Luea, designation decommissioned
  Route 3024: Route 205, Ban Mi – Khao Chong Lom
  Route 3027: Tha Wung - Ban Berk
  Route 3028: Bang Nga - Ban Mee
 Route 3029: Highway 1 (Khao Phra Ngam) to a military district; now local road 7-0002
  Route 3030: Dong Makhamthet - Bang Rachan
 Route 3031: Sing Buri – In Buri District, designation decommissioned
  Route 3032: Mueang Sing Buri - Doem Bang Nang Buat
  Route 3033: Bang Nga - Pokhawiwat
  Route 3034: Na Phra Lan - Baan Krua
 Route 3035: Route 321, Kamphaeng Saen District – Bang Len District – Lat Lum Kaeo District, combined with Route 3035 and Route 3194; now part of Route 346 except for a section in Pathum Thani Province that is still Route 3035
  Route 3036: Route 3095, Mueang Nakhon Pathom – intersection at Route 346, Don Tum; now part of Route 375
 Route 3037: Suphanburi - Route 340 (Bang Pla Ma); designation decommissioned
  Route 3038: Don Chedi - Sri Prachan
  Route 3039: Sadao Du - Pak Nam intersection
  Route 3040: Kamphaeng Saen - Phra Thaen Dong Rang
  Route 3041 (Pichai Ronson Songkhram Road): Saraburi - Khaokhad
  Route 3042: Nong Yao - Phra Buddha Chai
  Route 3043: Uthai - Saphan Mai
 Route 3044: Sao Hai – Nong Saeng, now part of Route 3041
  Route 3045: Wihan Daeng - Nong Moo
  Route 3046: Phra Buddha Chai - Sam Lan Falls
 Route 3047: Mueang Phuket – Nong Saeng, now part of Route 3041
  Route 3048: Huay Bong - Tha Lan
  Route 3049: Route 33, Mueang Nakhon Nayok – Nang Rong Falls (Nakhon Nayok Province)
  Route 3050: Entrance to Sarika Waterfall (Nakhon Nayok Province)
  Route 3051: Ban Na - Office of the Atomic Energy for Peace
  Route 3052: Pa San - Khao Cha Ngok
 Route 3053: Route 309 (Pridi Thamrong Bridge) – Route 32 (Ayutthaya Province), downgraded to local roads 2-0020 and 2-0021
 Route 3054: Route 309 – U Thong Road (north side); designation decommissioned
 Route 3055: Route 309 – U Thong Road (south side); designation decommissioned
  Route 3056: Ban Wa - Phachi
 Route 3057: Bang Pa-In Railway Station – Bang Pa-In, downgraded to local road
 Route 3058: Route 309 – Dusidaram Temple (Ayutthaya Province), downgraded to local road 4-0004
 Route 3059: Route 309 – Phanan Choeng Temple (Ayutthaya Province), downgraded to local roads 4-0001 and 2-0020
 Route 3060: 
 Route 3061: 
 Route 3062: Route 309, Wat Pun – Bang Pahan, designation decommissioned
 Route 3063: Bo Phong – Khok Mali
  Route 3064: Ang Thong – Pak Dong
 Route 3065: Pho Thong – Sawaeng Ha, now part of Route 3064
 Route 3066: Rangsit – Pratunam Chulalongkorn, designation decommissioned
  Route 3067: Aranyaprathet – Phai Lom
 Route 3068: Aranyaprathet – Lahan Sai, redesignated as Route 348
  Route 3069 (Prachin Anuson Road): Prachin Buri - Sri Maha Phot
  Route 3070: Sri Mahosot - Sri Maha Bodhi
 Route 3071 (Khokkha-Bua Lai Road): Prachinburi Railway Station – Khlong Khok Ka, downgraded to local road
 Route 3072(Siwaboon Road): Junction to Prachantakham, now local road 10-002
 Route 3073: Entrance to Watthana Nakhon, designation decommissioned
 Route 3074: Entrance to Kabinkuri, downgraded to local road
 Route 3075: Junction to Sa Kaeo Railway Station, downgraded to local road
  Route 3076
  Route 3077
  Route 3078
  Route 3079
 Route 3080: Entrance to Photharam
  Route 3081
 Route 3082: Junction to Tamaka, designation decommissioned
 Route 3083: Junction to Pak Phraek Station, designation decommissioned
  Route 3084
  Route 3085 Yang Ko–Si Mongkhon
 Route 3086 Lat Ya–Dan Chang
 Route 3087 Ratchaburi-Cheek Ong
 Route 3088 Ratchaburi-Wan Dao
 Route 3089: Khao Ngu Stone Park – Route 323 (Ratchaburi Province), now part of Route 3291
  Route 3090: Ban Chom - Nong Tak Ya
  Route 3091: (Setthakit Road 1): Motorway 35, Mueang Samut Sakhon – Route 4, Krathum Baen
  Route 3092
  Route 3093
  Route 3094: Entrance to Nakhon Chai Si
 Route 3095
 Route 3096: Rachamankha - Sanam Chan, downgraded to local road
  Route 3097: Route 4, Phra Prathon – Route 35 (Ban Bo), now part of Route 375
 Route 3098: Entrance to Sam Phran, downgraded to local road
 Route 3099 (Nonthaburi Road 1, Sanambinnam Road): Route 306 – Pak Kret Airport, combined with Route 3110
  Route 3100: Route 346, Rangsit – Rangsit Canal (Pathum Thani Province), now part of Route 345
 Route 3101(Sihaburanukit Road): Entrance to Min Buri (Bangkok), downgraded to local road 
  Route 3102 (Sanphawut Road): Bang Na – Route 3109 (Bangkok)
 Route 3103 (Wongsawang Road): Bang Hid - Rama VI - Wat Thong Thong (Bangkok), downgraded to local road
 Route 3104 (Nakorn Khuean Khan Road): Entrance to Phra Pradaeng, downgraded to local road
 Route 3105:
 Route 3106:
 Route 3107:
 Route 3108:
 Route 3109 (Old Paknum Railway Road): Khlong Toei – Route 3, downgraded to local road 
  Route 3110 (Nonthaburi Road 1, Sanambinnam Road): Leam Rim Nam Municipality - Bang Kraso (Nonthaburi Province), combined with Route 3099; later redesignated as local highway 2-0017
  Route 3111: Route 307/Route 3035, Pathum Thani Province – Route 3263, Sena District
Route 3112: Pathum Thani - Lat Lum Kaeo, combined with Route 3035; much of route now part of Route 346 except for the section from route origin to the Pathum Thani Provincial Administration Office which is still Route 3035
  Route 3113 (Phuchao Saming Phray Road): Route 3 – Bhumibol Bridge (Mueang Samut Prakan)
 Route 3114 (Thai Ban Road): Thai Ban – Pak Nam (Samut Prakan Province), downgraded to local road
 Route 3115 (Sai Luat Road): Route 3 – Route 3114 (Samut Prakan Province), downgraded to local road
  Route 3116 (Phraek Sa Road): Route 3 (Bang Ping) – Phraek Sa, downgraded to local road
  Route 3117 (Khlong Dan-Bang Bo Road, Rattanarat Road): Route 3, Khlong Dan – Bang Na Expressway, Bang Bo (Samut Prakan Province)
 Route 3118:
  Route 3119 (Rom Klao Road): Min Buri - Lat Krabang (Bangkok)
 Route 3120 (Samphan Road): Lam Phak Chi - Nong Chok, downgraded to local road
 Route 3121: Bangkhla - Plaeng Yao
 Route 3122:
 Route 3123: Bangkhla – Bang Nam Priao (Chachoengsao Province), designation decommissioned
 Route 3125: Bangpakong Intersection (Chachoengsao Province), downgraded to local road
 Route 3126: Plutaluang - Samae San
 Route 3127: Map Pong - Hua Pai
 Route 3128: Route 3 – Sriracha Market (Chonburi Province), designation decommissioned
 Route 3129: Junction to Bang Phra Reservoir (Chonburi Province), now local road 24-007
 Route 3130: Bang Pla Soi Intersection (Chonburi Province), downgraded to local road
 Route 3131: Chonburi – Khao Bang Sai Temple (Chonburi Province), downgraded to local road
 Route 3132 (Pattaya-Naklua Road): Route 3 – Banglamung District (Chonburi Province), now local road 2-0008
 Route 3133: Chonburi – Klaeng District (Chonburi Province), much of route now part of Route 344; remainder now local roads, rural route 3059 and Highway 3289
 Route 3134 (Ang Sila Road): Ang Sila Intersection - Khao Sam Muk (Chonburi Province)
 Route 3135 (Pattaya-Naklua Road, One Pattaya Road, South Pattaya Road): Na Kluea Market – South Pattaya (Chonburi Province), downgraded to local road
 Route 3136 (North Pattaya Road): Route 3 – North Pattaya (Chonburi Province), downgraded to local road
 Route 3137:
  Route 3138: Ban Bueng - Mappu
  Route 3139: Ban Lang - Hat Yai
 Route 3140: Entrance to Ban Phe
 Route 3141: Junction to U-Tapao, designation decommissioned
 Route 3142:
 Route 3143: Ban Khai - Nong Lalok
 Route 3144: Entrance to Khao Kheow Open Zoo
 Route 3145: Ban Phe - Laem Mae Phim (Rayong Province)
 Route 3146:
 Route 3147 (Si Bunruang Road): Hua Hin – Tha Mai (Chanthaburi Province), downgraded to local road
 Route 3148: Trat-Laem Ngop
 Route 3149:
 Route 3150 (Tha Luang Road): Route 3 (Koh Rong) – Rin Nam Chanthaburi, downgraded to local road
 Route 3151: Route 3149 (Nong Chim) – Perid Island, one section now rural route 4001 and the remainder downgraded to local road
 Route 3152: 
 Route 3153 (Phraya Trang Road): Chanthaburi – Tha Mai
 Route 3154 (Trirat Road): Trirat Bridge – Route 3 (Ploy Siam), downgraded to local road
 Route 3155:
 Route 3156:
 Route 3157:
 Route 3158:
 Route 3159:
 Route 3160: Tha Mi Park – Bang Kradan, now part of Route 3156
 Route 3161: Route 3 – Ao Kai Intersection (Rayong Province), now local highway 1-0042
 Route 3162: Junction to Pak Nam Prasae (Rayong Province), now local highway 10-018, 1-0032, and rural route 4036
 Route 3163:
 Route 3164:
 Route 3165:
 Route 3166:
 Route 3167:
 Route 3168:
 Route 3169:
 Route 3170:
 Route 3171:
 Route 3172: Junction to Khao Yoi Railway Station (Phetchaburi Province), designation decommissioned
 Route 3173:
 Route 3174:
 Route 3175:
 Route 3176:
 Route 3177:
 Route 3178:
 Route 3179:
 Route 3180:
 Route 3181: Entrance to Tha Sae Market
 Route 3182: Route 3077 (Nong Khing) – Khao Khiao (Nakhon Nayok Province), downgraded to local road
 Route 3183:
 Route 3184:
 Route 3185 (Lat Phrao Road): Bang Sue – Bang Kapi (Bangkok), redesignated as Route 336; now a local road
 Route 3186:
 Route 3187:
  Route 3188 (Phran Nok Road): Fai Chai Junction – Phran Nok Junction (Bangkok), downgraded to local road
 Route 3189:
 Route 3190:
  Route 3191:
 Route 3192:
 Route 3193:
 Route 3194: Phanom Thuan District - Phra Thaen Dong Rang - Kamphaeng Saen District, now part of Route 346
  Route 3195: 
  Route 3196:
 Route 3197: Highway 33 (Huai Chot) – Bo Ning Ching (Sa Kheo Province), now rural road 66-001
 Route 3198:
 Route 3199:
 Route 3200:
 Route 3201:
  Highway 3202 (Nawamin Road,): Bang Kapi – Khan Na Yao (Bangkok), downgraded to local road
 Route 3203:
 Route 3204:
 Route 3205:
 Route 3206:
 Route 3207:
 Route 3208:
 Route 3209:
 Route 3210:
 Route 3211:
 Route 3212:
 Route 3213:
  Route 3214 (Chiang Rak Road, Khlong Luang Road): Route 347, Sam Khok – Rural Highway 3010, Khlong Luang (Pathum Thani Province) 
  Route 3215 (Bang Kruai-Sai Noi Road): Wat Daeng-Sai Noi
 Route 3216 (Thep Khunakorn Road): Route 314 – Srisothon Road (Chachoengsao Province), downgraded to local road 
 Route 3217:
 Route 3218:
  Route 3219: Route 3218 (Nong Taphao) – Pa La U (Prachuap Khiri Khan Province), now Route 3218 and rural route 2052
 Route 3220:
 Route 3221:
 Route 3222:
 Route 3223: Route 3017 – Khram Phran Intersection (Saraburi Province), designation decommissioned
 Route 3224:
 Route 3225:
 Route 3226:
 Route 3227: Route 3193 (Phakat) – O Lam Chee (Chanthaburi Province), now rural route 4031
 Route 3228:
 Route 3229:
 Route 3230: Tambon U Thong Sanitation Area – Ban Rai, now part of Route 333
 Route 3231:
  Route 3232
  Route 3233
 Route 3234:
 Route 3235:
 Route 3236:
 Route 3237:
 Route 3238:
 Route 3239:
 Route 3240:
 Route 3241:
  Route 3242 (Ekkachai Road): Samut Sakhon-Bangpakok 8 Hospital
 Route 3243:
 Route 3244:
 Route 3245:
 Route 3246:
 Route 3247:
 Route 3248: Route 3193 (Ban Pa) – Nong Kok (Chanthaburi Province), now rural route 4032
 Route 3249:
 Route 3250:
 Route 3251:
 Route 3252:
 Route 3253:
 Route 3254:
Route 3255 : Junction to Ban Laem, now rural route 4033
  Route 3256 (King Kaew Road (Section Theparak Road-Lat Krabang Road)), (Tamru-Bang Phli Road (Section Sukhumvit Road-Theparak Road), : Bangpoo-King Kaew
 Route 3257: Nonthaburi Bridge – Route 340, now part of Route 345
 Route 3258: Ban Mi District – In Buri, designation decommissioned
  Route 3260
 Route 3261:
 Route 3262:
  Route 3263
 Route 3264:
 Route 3265:
 Route 3266:
  Route 3267
  Route 3268 (Theparak Road): Samrong-Bang Bo
 Route 3269:
 Route 3270: Khlong Yai District – Hat Lek, became part of Route 318; now part of Route 3
 Route 3271:
 Route 3272:
 Route 3273:
 Route 3274: Route 3087 (Buakhao Intersection) – Route 3209 (Cheek On), now part of Route 3087
 Route 3275: In Buri Intersection (Sing Buri Province), downgraded to local road
 Route 3276:
 Route 3277:
  Route 3278 (Seri Thai Road): Bang Kapi – Min Buri (Bangkok), downgraded to local road
 Route 3286 (Jaranyanon Road): Route 34 (Bang Wua) – Route 314 (Bang Pakong), downgraded to local road
 Route 3287:
 Route 3288:
 Route 3289:
 Route 3290:
 Route 3291:
 Route 3292: Route 318 (Tha Sai) – Laem Klat, now a rural route
 Route 3293:
 Route 3294: Route 321 (Kamphaeng Saen) – Kamphaeng Saen Aviation School, designation decommissioned
 Route 3295: Route 309 – Ang Thong, designation decommissioned
  Route 3296
 Route 3297:
 Route 3298:
 Route 3299:
 Route 3300: Route 3 (Khao Yai Chum) – Route 3145 (Suan Son), now local road 1-0016
 Route 3301: Route 3219 (Nong Phlap) – Yang Chum, now part of Route 3218
 Route 3302:
 Route 3303:
 Route 3304:
 Route 3305:
 Route 3306:
 Route 3307: Route 3198 (Nong Tao) – Wang Ri (Sa Kaeo Province), now part of rural route 4033
 Route 3308:
  Route 3309 Route 346 Muang Pathum Thani, Pathum thani - Route 308, Route 3477 Bang Pa In, Phra Nakhorn Si Ayutthaya
  Route 3310: (Phutthamonthon Sai 4 Road): Krathum Lom-Phutthamonthon
 Route 3311: Entrance to Khao Thong, downgraded to local road
  Route 3312: (Lam Luk Ka Road): Rangsit-Lam Luk Ka (Pathum Thani)
  Route 3313: Route 3087 (Pa Wai Chat) – Pong Krating (Ratchaburi Province), now part of Route 3206
 Route 3314:
 Route 3315: Route 314 – Route 3296 (Bang Phra), now local road 1-0005
  Route 3316: (Phutthamonthon Sai 6 Road): Raikhing-Song Khanong
 Route 3317:
 Route 3318:
 Route 3319:
 Route 3320: Route 3 (Kachet) – Hat Yai (Rayong Province), downgraded to local road
 Route 3321:
 Route 3322:
 Route 3323 (Thetsaban 1 Road, Phisanathumkhun Road): Route 3 (Nern Sung) – Route 3147 (Chanthaburi Province), now local highway 21-001
 Route 3324: Route 3313 (Suan Phueng) – Huai Suea (Ratchaburi Province), downgraded to local road
 Route 3325:
 Route 3326:
 Route 3327:
 Route 3328: Khao Bo Kew settlement – Hua Ngew (Nakhon Sawan Province), downgraded to local road
 Route 3329:
 Route 3330:
 Route 3331:
 Route 3332:
 Route 3333:
 Route 3334:
 Route 3335:
 Route 3336:
 Route 3337:
 Route 3338:
 Route 3339:
 Route 3340:
 Route 3341: Ko Pho – Route 3245 (Chonburi Province), now local road 1-1005
 Route 3342:
 Route 3343:
  Highway 3344: (Srinagarindra Road): Bang Kapi-Samut Prakan
 Route 3345 (Charuwar Road): Phanat Nikhom - Nong Chak (Chonburi Province), redesignated as Highway 349
 Route 3346:
 Route 3347: Phanom Sarakham - Ban Sang, now part of Route 3076
 Route 3348:
 Route 3349:
 Route 3350:
  Route 3351
 Route 3352:
 Route 3353:
  Route 3354
 Route 3355:
  Route 3356
 Route 3357:
 Route 3358:
 Route 3359:
 Route 3360:
 Route 3361: Dan Makham Tia - Nong Pak Dong, designation decommissioned
 Route 3362:
 Route 3363:
 Route 3364:
 Route 3365:
 Route 3366:
 Route 3367:
 Route 3368:
 Route 3369:
 Route 3370: Route 3247 (Khao Hom) – Route 3193 (Ban Pa), downgraded to local road
 Route 3371: Route 3143 – Route 3191 (Rayong Province), now local road 1-0063
 Route 3372:
  Route 3373
 Route 3374:
 Route 3375:
  Route 3376
 Route 3377: Route 3 (Khao Din) – Nong Samet (Rayong Province), now local roads 10-017 and 1-0036
 Route 3378:
 Route 3379: Route 3068 (Aranyaprathet) – Pa Rai (Sa Kaeo Province), combined with Route 3397, now part of rural route SS 3085
 Route 3380: Route 3068 (Nong Yak) – Route 3381 (Ang Sila), downgraded to local road
 Route 3381: Route 3068 (Nong Waeng) – Pa Rai (Sa Kaeo Province), one section became part of Route 3397, now rural route SS 3085; other section became Route 348, now rural route SK 3086
 Route 3382: Route 3068 (Khok Phrek) – Khok Rek, now rural road SK 3069
 Route 3383: Route 3367 (Khao Noi) – Route 3384 (Sai Sing), now part of Route 3366 and Route 3067
 Route 3384:
 Route 3385:
 Route 3386:
 Route 3387:
 Route 3388:
 Route 3389:
 Route 3390:
 Route 3391:
 Route 3392: Route 3 (Huai Pong) – Nong Fae Intersection (Rayong Province), downgraded to local road
 Route 3393: Route 3198 (Chong Kum) – Route 348 (Kaew Petch), now part of Route 3395
  Route 3394
 Route 3395:
 Route 3396: Route 1 – Chao Phraya River (Nakhon Sawan Province), downgraded to local road
 Route 3397: Route 3068 (Na Ngam) – Route 3381 (Khok Sung), combined with Routes 3379 and 3381 and redesignated Route 348; now rural route 3085
 Route 3398:
 Route 3399: Route 3 (Nong Si Nga) – Laem Sadet (Chanthaburi Province), now rural routes 1036 and 4001
 Route 3400: 
 Route 3401:
 Route 3402:
 Route 3403:
 Route 3404:
 Route 3405:
 Route 3406: Route 3  (Na Yai Am) – Nong Chek Soi (Chanthaburi Province), downgraded to local road
 Route 3407: Route 3 (Nong Khla) – Tapong (Chanthaburi Province), downgraded to local road
 Route 3408: Route 3 (Don Samrong) – Taeng, now rural route 1030
 Route 3409:
 Route 3410:
  Route 3411: Route 3253 (Don Yang) – Route 3374 (Nong Toi Tai), now part of Route 3374
  Route 3412
  Route 3413: (Bang Bo Bypass Road, 
  Route 3414: (Phutthamonthon Sai 5 Road): Omnoi-Salaya
  Route 3415: (Phutthamonthon Sai 7 Road): Sam Phran-Nakhon Chai Si River
 Route 3416:
 Route 3417: Junction to Nong Yai, downgraded to local road
 Route 3418: Entrance to Bang Sai, now local road 1-0044
 Route 3419: Junction to Bang Sai, downgraded to local road
  Route 3420
 Route 3421: Route 317 (Wang Chik) – Nong Yai, now rural route SK 3008
 Route 3422:
  Route 3423
 Route 3424:
 Route 3425:
 Route 3426:
 Route 3427:
 Route 3428:
 Route 3429:
 Route 3430 (Ban Na Road): Route 3 – Nern U Thong, downgraded to local road 
 Route 3431:
 Route 3432:
 Route 3433 (Khao Wong Road): Route 3 (Kao Din intersection) – Route 3406 (Rayong Province), downgraded to local road
 Route 3434: Route 317 – Route 317 (Khao Chakan), now rural route 3087
 Route 3435:
 Route 3436:
 Route 3437(Sunthorn Vej Road): Route 3 (Noen Din intersection) – Noen Yong, downgraded to local road
 Route 3438:
 Route 3439: Route 321 – Route 3431 (Suphan Buri Province), now part of Route 321
 Route 3440:
 Route 3441:
 Route 3442:
 Route 3443:
 Route 3444:
 Route 3445:
 Route 3446:
 Route 3447:
 Route 3448: 
 Route 3449:
 Route 3450:
  Route 3451
 Route 3452:
 Route 3453:
  Route 3454
 Route 3455:
 Route 3456:
 Route 3457:
 Route 3458:
 Route 3459:
 Route 3460: 
 Route 3461: 
 Route 3462: 
 Route 3463:
 Route 3464:
 Route 3465:
 Route 3466:
 Route 3467:
 Route 3468:
 Route 3469:
 Route 3470:
 Route 3471:
 Route 3472: 
 Route 3473:
 Route 3474:
 Route 3475:
 Route 3476:
  Route 3477:Route  Bang pa in - Chedi Wat Sam Pluem  Phai Ling
 Route 3478:
 Route 3479:
 Route 3480:
 Route 3481:
 Route 3482: Junction to Uthai, designation decommissioned
 Route 3483:
 Route 3484: Route 3249 (Khlong Plu) – Chanthak Lom (Chanthaburi Province), downgraded to local road
 Route 3485: Route 3462 – Route 3198 (Sa Kaeo Province), now part of Route 3462
 Route 3486:
 Route 3487:
 Route 3488:
 Route 3489:
 Route 3490:
 Route 3491:
 Route 3492: 
 Route 3493: 
 Route 3494:
 Route 3495:
 Route 3496: 
 Route 3497: 
 Route 3498:
 Route 3499: 
 Route 3500: 
 Route 3501:
 Route 3502:
 Route 3503:
 Route 3504:
 Route 3505:
 Route 3506: 
 Route 3507: 
 Route 3508: 
 Route 3509:
 Route 3510:
 Route 3511: 
 Route 3512:
 Route 3513: Route 321 – Ban Yang (Suphan Buri Province), downgraded to local road
 Route 3514:
 Route 3515:
 Route 3516:
 Route 3517:
 Route 3518:
 Route 3519: Khlong Son – Khlong Muang, now rural road 1036
 Route 3520
 Route 3521: 
 Route 3522:
 Route 3523
 Route 3524:
 Route 3525:
 Route 3526:
 Route 3527:
 Route 3528:
 Route 3529:
 Route 3530:
 Route 3531:
 Route 3532:
 Route 3533:
 Route 3534: 
 Route 3535:
 Route 3536:
 Route 3537:
 Route 3538:
 Route 3539: 
 Route 3540:
 Route 3541:
 Route 3542:
 Route 3543:
 Route 3544:
 Route 3545:
 Route 3546:
 Route 3547:
 Route 3548: 
 Route 3549:
 Route 3550:
 Route 3551:
 Route 3552:
 Route 3553:
 Route 3554:
 Route 3555:
 Route 3556:
 Route 3557:
 Route 3558:
 Route 3559:
 Route 3560: 
 Route 3561: 
 Route 3562: 
 Route 3563:
 Route 3564:
 Route 3565:
 Route 3566:
 Route 3567:
 Route 3568:
 Route 3569:
 Route 3570:
 Route 3571:
 Route 3572: 
 Route 3573:
 Route 3574:
 Route 3575:
 Route 3576:
 Route 3577:
 Route 3578:
 Route 3579:
 Route 3580:
 Route 3581:
 Route 3582: 
 Route 3583:
  Route 3584
 Route 3585: 
 Route 3586:
 Route 3587:
 Route 3588:
 Route 3589:
 Route 3590:
 Route 3591:
 Route 3592: 
 Route 3593: 
 Route 3594:
 Route 3595:
 Route 3596: 
 Route 3597: 
 Route 3598:
 Route 3599: 
 Route 3600: Gay Chai - Chum Saeng; former routing of Highway 225
 Route 3601:
 Route 3602:
 Route 3603:
 Route 3604:
 Route 3605:
 Route 3606: 
 Route 3607: 
 Route 3608: 
 Route 3609:
 Route 3610:
 Route 3611: 
 Route 3612:
 Route 3613: 
 Route 3614:
 Route 3615:
 Route 3616:
 Route 3617:
 Route 3618: Huai Jod original route; former routing of Highway 33
 Route 3619: 
 Route 3620:
 Route 3621: Entrance to Banphot Phisai
 Route 3622:
 Route 3623:
 Route 3624:
 Route 3625:
 Route 3626:
 Route 3627: Khok Hom - Khlong Hae; former routing of Highway 33
 Route 3628:
 Route 3629:
 Route 3630:
 Route 3631:
 Route 3632: Entrance to Wat Kamphaeng (Ayutthaya Province), downgraded to local road
 Route 3633: Bang Toei – Chao Phraya River (Pathum Thani Province), downgraded to local road
 Route 3634:
 Route 3635: 
 Route 3636: 
 Route 3637:
 Route 3638: 
 Route 3639: 
 Route 3640: 
 Route 3641: 
 Route 3642:
 Route 3643: Samut Songkhram Bypass Road; former Highway 3093
 Route 3644: 
 Route 3645: 
 Route 3646:
 Route 3647:
 Route 3648: Klaeng Bypass Road
 Route 3649: Khok Pak Phli - Huay Khue; former routing of Highway 33
 Route 3701:
 Route 3702:
 Route 3901:
 Route 3902:

Southern Thailand 
  Highway 4: (Phet Kasem Road): Bangkok–Sadao via Hat Yai
  Highway 41: Chumphon–Phattalung
  Highway 42: Songkhla–Narathiwat
  Highway 43: Songkhla–Pattani
  Highway 44: Krabi–Surat Thani
  Highway 401: Takua Pa–Nakhon Si Thammarat
  Highway 402: Takua Thung - Phuket
  Highway 403: Mueang Nakhon Si Thammarat - Kantang
  Highway 404: (Trang-Chalung Road): Mueang Trang - Andaman Sea in Palian
  Highway 405: Nakhon Si Thammarat - Phatthalung; now part of Highway 41
  Highway 406: Phattalung - Satun
  Highway 407: Klong Wa - Songkhla
  Highway 408: Nakhon Si Thammarat - Songkhla
  Highway 409: Pattani  - Yala
  Highway 410: (Pattani–Betong Highway): Pattani–Betong
 Highway 411: (Uttarakit Road): Connection to Krabi; downgraded to a local road
  Highway 412: Entrance to Ranong
  Highway 414: (Lopburi Ramesuan Road): Mueang Songkhla - Route 4 (Songkhla Province)
  Highway 415: Krabi - Surat Thani
  Highway 416: Mueang Satun - Palian; now part of Highway 404
  Highway 417: Surat Thani Airport - Surat Thani
  Highway 418: Ban Khlong Khut - Ban Tha Sap
  Highway 419: Trang Ring Road
  Highway 420: Surat Thani Ring Road
  Highway 421: Satun Bypass Road
  Highway 425: Hat Yai East Bypass Road
 Highway 4001:
 Highway 4002:
 Highway 4003:
 Highway 4004: Ranong - Paknam; downgraded to local road
 Highway 4005:
 Highway 4006:
 Highway 4007: Junction to Don Nok Airport; downgraded to local road
 Highway 4008:
 Highway 4009:
 Highway 4010:
 Highway 4011:
  Highway 4012: a short route between Ban Tha Pae and Nakhon Si Thammarat Town; now part of Highway 401. Highway 4012 was rerouted east of Fort Vachirawut
 Highway 4017: Nakhon Si Thammarat - Ranot; now part of Highway 408
 Highway 4039: Highway 4 (Ao Luek) - Laem Sak; downgraded to rural road
 Highway 4040: Highway 401 (Phanom) - Pak Laos; now part of Highway 415
  Highway 4054: (Padang Besar-Sadao Highway): Padang Besar–Songkhla
  Highway 4056: (Sungai Padi Road): Manang Tayo-Sungai Golok
 Highway 4078: Chalung - Palian; renumbered as Highway 416, now part of Highway 404
  Highway 4184: (Wang Prachan Road) (Sadao).
 Highway 4371: Sam Yaek - Yong Star; former portion of Highway 404
 Highway 4372:
 Highway 4373:

Department of Highway signage

Route number signs
DOH signs for public highways (ทางหลวง, thang luang) are white squares with a black garuda (ครุฑ khrut) centered above the route number.
 Signs near the beginning of a route may display the highway's name on a white rectangle above or below the square.
 Highways bypassing city centres bear the principal route number marked "Bypass" in Thai (เลี่ยงเมือง), and sometimes also in English.

Department of Rural Roads 
DORR rural roads do not follow the regional numbering scheme, above. Signs may be black-on-white or gold-on-blue, with a two-letter province designation prefixed to the road number. Depicted is SK. 3015, for a rural road in Songkhla Province. The Department of Rural Roads of the Ministry of Transport takes care of the maintenance of all the rural roads in Thailand.

Kilometer stones 

Milestone as goal is lakh chai (หลักชัย); also see Lak Mueang, Lakh.

 or   single-carriageway kilometer stone facings display the route number on the outline of a garuda. Some kilometer stones also display the route number on top. Those located to the left of the carriageway display kilometers remaining to the road's beginning at kilometer 0. As seen on the right from the opposite lane, the kilometer stones ascend in value as one proceeds away from kilometer 0. On edges facing traffic, DOH kilometer stones usually show distances remaining to the next two towns, (amphoe seats, or provincial capitals.) Some edges, such as the one depicted to the left, have retroreflector panels. Dual carriageway kilometer stones or posts in the median strip show only the kilometer number.

See also 
 Thai motorway network
 Road signs in Thailand
 List of motor vehicle deaths in Thailand by year

References

External links
 Asian / ASEAN Highway Route Marker (21MB) Department of Highways Thai-language 18-page file, with 1 index and 8 regional maps of AH system overlaid on existing Thai national highways, plus diagrams of AH route markers. Retrieved 2008-10-14.

Roads in Thailand